Simon Bedford (born 8 February 1976) is an English former professional snooker player.

Career
Bedford's best performance in a professional ranking event was to qualify for the 1998 World Championship; he beat Gary Wilkinson 10–9, before losing 10–6 to Steve Davis. He also reached the last 32 of the European Open in 2004 and the Grand Prix in 2008, beating two-time World Champion Mark Williams en route. He qualified to return to the Main Tour for the 2008–09 season by finishing fourth in the 2007/2008 Pontins International Open Series rankings.

In the 2012–13 season, he became the only player to beat World Champion Ronnie O'Sullivan, after a 4–3 win from 3–2 behind in the first main round of the third UK event of the Players Tour Championship in September.

At the beginning of the 2013–14 season, in qualifying against Barry Pinches for the 2013 Australian Goldfields Open, a 19-year-old record from the qualifying stage of the 1994 British Open was broken. The match lasted 449 minutes and 46 seconds, the longest ever best-of-nine-frame match in the history of professional snooker. The previous record was 434 minutes and 12 seconds in the match between Ian Williamson and Robby Foldvari. The match began on 31 May 2013 and ended on 1 June 2013; Bedford won 5–4, after being 4–0 up. Bedford only entered six further events during the season, winning five matches. After a first round defeat in the UK Championship in November he did not enter another tournament, resulting in his relegation from the main tour as he ended the season ranked 99th in the world. Bedford returned to play in 2017 Q School and was knocked out in the fifth round of the first event and the second round of event two.

Performance and rankings timeline

Tournament wins

Non-Ranking Wins: (2 titles)

UK Tour Event 3 – 1998
UK Tour Event 3 – 2000

Pro-am wins
 Vienna Snooker Open – 2012

Amateur wins
 PIOS – Event 1 - 2007
 Challenge Tour – Event 8 - 2018

References

External links
 
 Profile on Global Snooker

English snooker players
1976 births
Living people
Sportspeople from Bradford